Gymnophora is a genus of scuttle flies (insects in the family Phoridae). There are at least 60 described species in Gymnophora.

Species
These 69 species belong to the genus Gymnophora:

 Gymnophora acutangula Schmitz, 1929 c g
 Gymnophora adumbrata Borgmeier, 1960 c g
 Gymnophora aemula Borgmeier, 1960 c g
 Gymnophora alces Brown, 1987 c g
 Gymnophora amurensis Mostovski & Mikhailovskaya, 2003 c g
 Gymnophora arcuata (Meigen, 1830) c g
 Gymnophora auricula Brown, 1987 c g
 Gymnophora brasiliensis Borgmeier, 1960 c g
 Gymnophora browni Liu, 2001 c g
 Gymnophora carina Brown, 1987 i c g
 Gymnophora chilensis Borgmeier, 1960 c g
 Gymnophora colona Brues, 1911 c g
 Gymnophora commotria Schmitz, 1929 c g
 Gymnophora cymatoneura Enderlein, 1912 c g
 Gymnophora damula Brown, 1987 c g
 Gymnophora dispariseta Brown, 1998 c g
 Gymnophora emarginata Brown, 1998 c g
 Gymnophora enigmata Brown, 1989 c g
 Gymnophora falciformis Brown, 1987 c g
 Gymnophora fastigiorum Schmitz, 1952 i c g
 Gymnophora forcipis Brown, 1987 c g
 Gymnophora forticornis Schmitz, 1927 c g
 Gymnophora gornostaevi Mostovski & Mikhailovskaya, 2003 c g
 Gymnophora gotoi Brown, 1989 c g
 Gymnophora healeyae Disney, 1980 c g
 Gymnophora heteroneura Schmitz, 1929 c g
 Gymnophora inexpectata Beyer, 1958 c g
 Gymnophora integralis Schmitz, 1920 c g
 Gymnophora inthanonensis Brown, 1998 c g
 Gymnophora inusitata Brown, 1987 c g
 Gymnophora lacertosa Brown, 1987 c g
 Gymnophora laciniata Mikhailovskaya, 1997 c g
 Gymnophora lapidicola (Bezzi, 1922) c g
 Gymnophora latibrachia Brown, 1987 c g
 Gymnophora longissima Brown, 1989 c g
 Gymnophora luteiventris Schmitz, 1952 i c g b
 Gymnophora malaisei Brown, 1998 c g
 Gymnophora marshalli Brown, 1987 i c g
 Gymnophora multipinnacula Brown, 1987 c g
 Gymnophora nepalensis Brown, 1989 c g
 Gymnophora nigripennis Schmitz, 1929 c g
 Gymnophora nonpachyneura Liu, 2001 c g
 Gymnophora palmula Brown, 1998 c g
 Gymnophora parachilensis Brown, 1987 c g
 Gymnophora pararcuata Brown, 1989 c g
 Gymnophora parva Brown, 1998 c g
 Gymnophora penai Brown, 1987 c g
 Gymnophora perpropinqua Mostovski & Mikhailovskaya, 2003 c g
 Gymnophora platypalpis Brown, 1989 c g
 Gymnophora prescherweberae Disney, 1997 c g
 Gymnophora priora Brown, 1989 c g
 Gymnophora prolata Brown, 1989 c g
 Gymnophora quadrata Brown, 1987 c g
 Gymnophora quadriseta Brown, 1989 c g
 Gymnophora quartomollis Schmitz, 1920 c g
 Gymnophora setulata Brown, 1989 c g
 Gymnophora spiracularis Borgmeier, 1971 c g
 Gymnophora strigula Brown, 1987 c g
 Gymnophora subarcuata Schmitz, 1952 i c g
 Gymnophora subuncata Brown, 1987 c g
 Gymnophora talea Brown, 1987 i c g
 Gymnophora tenuivenia Schmitz, 1931 c g
 Gymnophora thormini Brown, 1998 c g
 Gymnophora triangularis Brown, 1987 c g
 Gymnophora trispina Brown, 1987 c g
 Gymnophora uncata Brown, 1987 c g
 Gymnophora unidentata Brown, 1987 c g
 Gymnophora verrucata Schmitz, 1927 c g
 Gymnophora victoria Mostovski & Mikhailovskaya, 2003 c g

Data sources: i = ITIS, c = Catalogue of Life, g = GBIF, b = Bugguide.net

References

Further reading

External links

 

Phoridae
Articles created by Qbugbot
Platypezoidea genera